Nazila Fathi (born December 28, 1970) is an Iranian-Canadian author and former Teheran correspondent for The New York Times. She also reported on Iran for both Time and Agence France-Presse. In her book The Lonely War she interweaves her personal history with that of Iran, from the 1979 Revolution until, when continuing to report from Iran became life-threatening in 2009, she was forced into exile.

Biography

Fathi was born in Tehran in 1970. Her father was a senior civil servant in the Ministry of Energy. She studied English at Azad University, and while there began working as a translator for foreign reporters. From that beginning she became a stringer for The New York Times, Time, and Agence France-Presse.

Frustrated by the Iranian government's multi-year press accreditation process, Fathi moved to Canada in 1999 and became a Canadian citizen. She earned an MA in political science and women's studies from the University of Toronto in 2001 before returning to Tehran as a correspondent for The New York Times.

During the 2009 Iranian presidential election protests, Fathi and other journalists reported on the violence by the Iranian government against peaceful protestors. In early 2009, the Iranian government banned international journalists to stop coverage of the protests, but Fathi continued to report. In June 2009, other journalists were arrested by Iranian authorities. Fathi was placed under surveillance by the government, and threats were made against her life. In July 2009, she and her family left Iran for Canada.

She subsequently became an associate at Harvard's Belfer Center, a Nieman Fellow and a Shorenstein Fellow.

Fathi's book The Lonely War was published by Basic Books in November, 2014. Fathi also translated Nobel Laureate Shirin Ebadi's book, The History and Documentation of Human Rights in Iran.

Bibliography

Nonfiction
 Lonely War: One Woman's Account of the Struggle for Modern Iran (2014)

Children's books 

 My Name Is Cyrus (2020)
 Avicenna: The Father of Modern Medicine (2020)
 Razi: The Man Who Discovered How to Make Alcohol (2021)
 The Persian Warrior and Her Queen (2021)

References 

Writers from Tehran
Iranian women journalists
The New York Times writers
University of Toronto alumni
Canadian women journalists
1970 births
Living people
Canadian women non-fiction writers
People of the Iranian Revolution